United States coinage type set is a visual collection of each of the types of coins produced by the US Mints.  A "Type set" collection is enjoyed by some collectors of coins who try to collect one example of as many types of coins as they can.

Due to various reasons (including prohibitive cost), collectors will sometimes group several different coins together as one "type."  For example, one could collect a Liberty Seated dime, quarter, and half dollar, and call that their example of a Liberty Seated coin for each denomination.  Or, they could choose to collect an example of sub-types within the Liberty Seated design, including the with and without arrows at date, and with and without mottos.

Additionally, delineating sub-types within a particular design is not always consistent.  For example, almost all type collectors consider the 1909 "V.D.B." Lincoln cent to be different from the 1909 no-"V.D.B." Lincoln cent (where the designer's initials, V.D.B., were displayed on the bottom of the reverse and removed about a month later).  However, the "V.D.B." initials were returned to the Lincoln cent in 1918 on the bottom of the bust on the obverse, and almost no type collector considers this a separate type.  Likewise in the Lincoln cent series, the composition change in 1943 to steel and the composition change in 1982 from bronze to copper-plated zinc are considered separate types by almost all, but the brass composition used in 1944-1946 is not considered a separate type from the 1947 return to bronze.  (The Lincoln cent series is full of other examples, including modifications to the size of Lincoln's bust during the early 1970s).

Consequently, each collector will need to decide for themselves how specific they wish to be when putting together a U.S. coin type set, though the decision is often made for them if they choose specific albums, such as the very popular Dansco 7070.

US Copper Type Coins

US Nickel Type Coins

US Silver Type Coins

US Gold type coins

Page up to here should be correct

Bullion coins

External links
 United States Mint